Richard Thomas O'Keefe (September 29, 1923 – December 17, 2006) was an American professional basketball player. After serving as captain of the St. James High School basketball team in his hometown of San Francisco, California, O'Keefe began his college basketball career with Santa Clara Broncos in 1941. He missed the 1944–45 and 1945-46 seasons to serve in World War II, but returned to play his senior year with the Broncos in 1946-47. O'Keefe was selected with the ninth overall pick in the 1947 BAA draft by the Washington Capitols and played with the team for four years until it folded in 1951.

After his basketball career, O'Keefe worked as a security chief. He served as a charter member of Santa Clara's Athletic Hall of Fame, and was inducted into the San Francisco Prep Hall of Fame in 2002.

BAA/NBA career statistics

Regular season

Playoffs

References

External links
 

1923 births
2006 deaths
American men's basketball players
Basketball players from California
Santa Clara Broncos men's basketball players
Shooting guards
Small forwards
Washington Capitols draft picks
Washington Capitols players